Route 240 is a   south–north state highway in southeastern Massachusetts. Its southern terminus is at U.S. Route 6 (US 6) in Fairhaven and its northern terminus is at Interstate 195 (I-195) in Fairhaven.

Route description
Route 240 acts as a connector between U.S. Route 6 and I-195 in Fairhaven. There are ghost ramps at the northern end of the highway that show that Route 240 was intended to continue north of I-195 to Acushnet, which was originally planned in the 1970s, but lost traction over the years.    An aerial view of the northern terminus hints of a continuation beyond that point.  Most maps indicate that this divided highway is one that has limited access, but that is not true as there is an at-grade intersection with traffic signals at Bridge Street, just north of U.S. 6.

Major intersections

References

External links

240